MICEFA (Mission Interuniversitaire de Coordination des Échanges Franco-Américains) is a nonprofit organization that manages partnerships between universities throughout North America and in the area of Paris, France. Created in 1985, MICEFA has helped tens of thousands of students participate in cultural and scientific exchanges on both sides of the Atlantic. Students remain enrolled in, and pay tuition to, their home universities, while attending classes and receiving credits abroad. While the program is largely focused on undergraduates, some graduate study exchanges also may be arranged. The newest aspect of the exchange program is a medical exchange between several top medical schools in the United States and in Paris.

North American universities 
More than 60 North American universities are represented across the United States and Canada:

 California State University (CSU) system

 Bakersfield
 Channel Islands
 Chico
 Dominguez Hills
 East Bay
 Fresno
 Fullerton
 Humboldt
 Long Beach
 Los Angeles
 Monterey Bay
 Northridge
 Pomona (Polytechnic)
 Sacramento
 San Bernardino
 San Diego State
 San Francisco State
 San Jose State 
 San Luis Obispo (Polytechnic)
 San Marcos
 Sonoma State
 Stanislaus

 City University of New York (CUNY) system

 Baruch College
 Borough of Manhattan Community College
 Brooklyn College
 City College
 College of Staten Island
 The Graduate Center
 Hunter College
 John Jay College of Criminal Justice
 La Guardia Community College
 Lehman College
 Medgar Evers College
 Queens College
 Queensborough Community College
 York College

 State University of New York (SUNY) system

 Albany
 Binghamton University
 Brockport
 Buffalo
 Geneseo
 Oswego
 Potsdam
 Institute of Technology 
 New Paltz
 Plattsburgh
 Purchase College

 Others

 American University
 Baldwin-Wallace University
 Bellarmine University
 Centenary College of Louisiana
 Florida International University
 George Washington University
 Glendon College
 Louisiana State University
 Loyola University New Orleans
 Manhattan College
 McNeese State University
 New Mexico State University
 Northern Arizona University
 Pace University
 Rutgers, The State University of New Jersey
 Tarleton State University
 University of Connecticut
 University of Illinois at Chicago
 University of Louisiana at Lafayette
 University of Mary Washington
 University of Miami
 University of New Brunswick
 University of New Orleans
 University of Puerto Rico, Río Piedras Campus
 University of Saskatchewan
 University of South Florida
 University of Texas at Austin
 University of Waterloo
 University of Wisconsin-Milwaukee
 University of Wisconsin-Madison
 Vanderbilt University
 Xavier University of Louisiana

French universities 
All of MICEFA's university partners in France are located in the Paris metropolitan area:
CY Cergy Paris University
University of Évry Val d'Essonne
Paris Panthéon-Sorbonne University
Paris Sorbonne Nouvelle University
Sorbonne University
Université Paris Cité
Paris 8 University Vincennes-Saint-Denis
Paris Nanterre University
Paris-East Créteil University
Sorbonne Paris North University
Paris-Saclay University
University of Versailles Saint-Quentin-en-Yvelines
Institut Catholique de Paris
Panthéon-Assas University
Gustave Eiffel University
École normale supérieure Paris-Saclay
Institut supérieur d'électronique de Paris
Institut polytechnique des sciences avancées

Medical exchange universities 

In the United States:
Albert Einstein College of Medicine of Yeshiva University, Bronx, NY
Columbia University, New York City
George Washington University, Washington, D.C.
Harvard University, Cambridge, Mass.
University of Illinois, Chicago
University of Massachusetts, Worcester, Mass.
University of Miami Miller School of Medicine, Miami
University of Pennsylvania, Philadelphia
Tulane University, New Orleans
Weill-Cornell Medical College, New York City

In France:
Paris Diderot University
Paris Est-Creteil University
Paris Pierre et Marie Curie University
Paris Nord-Villetaneuse University
Paris Sud-Orsay University
Versailles Saint-Quentin-en-Yvelines University

References

External links 

France–United States relations
International college and university associations and consortia